A Chinese Ghost Story is a 1987 Hong Kong romantic comedy horror film starring Leslie Cheung, Joey Wong and Wu Ma, directed by Ching Siu-tung and produced by Tsui Hark. The plot is loosely based on a short story about Nie Xiaoqian from Qing dynasty writer Pu Songling's Strange Stories from a Chinese Studio and is also inspired by the 1960 Shaw Brothers Studio film The Enchanting Shadow. The film was popular in Hong Kong and several Asian countries, including South Korea and Japan. Although the film could not gain access to movie theaters in mainland China when it was first released, it became a cult film among young people in the mainland. At that time the film generated a phenomenal cult following among audiences, especially the generation born in the 1980s. In 2011, the Hong Kong producers screened a restored version officially in mainland China.

Most notably it boosted the stardom of Joey Wong, won Leslie Cheung popularity in Japan, and sparked a trend of folklore ghost films in the Hong Kong film industry, including two sequels, an animated film, a television series and a 2011 remake. The film was ranked number 50 of the Best 100 Chinese Motion Pictures presented at the 24th Hong Kong Film Awards, the Special Jury Special Award of the 16th French Science Fiction Film Festival and the Best Film Award of the Portuguese Science Fiction Film Festival.

Plot
Ning Choi-san, a timid tax collector, goes to a rural town to collect taxes but fails and runs out of money. A Chinese Ghost Story - TV Tropes He has no choice but to take shelter in a deserted temple in the forest on the outskirts of the town. That night, he meets a beautiful and alluring young maiden, Nip Siu-sin, and falls in love with her. In the morning, however, after he recalls that night's events, he becomes increasingly fearful and superstitious because Yin Chik-ha, a Taoist priest, told him that the people he saw in the temple are ghosts. That night, he returns to the temple and confirms his theory that Nip is actually a ghost.

Nip tells Ning her story of how she became eternally bound to the servitude of a sinister Tree Demoness. She explains that as long as her remains are buried at the foot of the tree, her spirit will be forever enslaved by the Tree Demoness. Ning attempts to free her from her suffering so he seeks help from Yin Chik-ha. Yin fights with the Tree Demoness and attempts to free Nip's soul but fails. As punishment for betraying her master, Nip's soul is banished to the Underworld.

Ning is unwilling to give up on Nip and he insists that Yin help him. Yin reluctantly opens a temporary portal into the Underworld and brings Ning along to search for Nip. As the Underworld is full of spirits, they have a hard time finding her. Ning and Nip are eventually able to see each other briefly near dawn when they manage to leave the Underworld. When sunlight shines on the urn containing Nip's cremated remains, Ning uses a curtain to shield the urn to prevent Nip's soul from being destroyed by exposure to sunlight. Before leaving for good, she tells him that the only way to save her soul is to rebury her remains at a more auspicious burial site. Ning follows her instructions and, acting on Yin's advice, he buries her remains near the crest of a hill. He burns a joss stick for her and prays for her soul while Yin watches solemnly behind him.

Ning and Yin are then seen riding off seeking a new adventure, with rainbow visible in the sky above them.

Cast
Leslie Cheung as Ning Choi-san
Joey Wong as Nip Siu-sin
Wu Ma as Yin Chik-ha
Lau Siu-ming as the Tree Demoness
Lam Wai as Hsia-hou
Xue Zhilun as Siu-ching
Wong Jing as the magistrate
David Wu as Secretary Chiu

Production
Producer Tsui Hark was interested in creating A Chinese Ghost Story as early as 1978, where he suggested it as a television production at TVB. The producer turned it down, feeling it would not be suitable for television. A Chinese Ghost Story uses elements of several stories from Pu Songling's 17th century collection Strange Stories from a Chinese Studio. Tsui Hark stated that they changed a lot of the stories for their adaptation as they found out the stories were against their initial interpretation. On developing the film, Tsui Hark noted that director Ching Siu-tung wanted to work with him. Ching Siu-tung had previously worked as a director and an action choreographer on various Film Workshop productions such as Peking Opera Blues and A Better Tomorrow II. Hark suggested developing A Chinese Ghost Story, describing it as a love story which Siu-tung was not as interested in developing as either a romance film or a non-horror based ghost story. Hark noted that his higher up approached him to develop the film into being about a female cop, not being aware that it was based on a book or that it was a period film. While working on the film, Hark and Siu-tung did not really know what it would end up being like, as Siu-tung was still apprehensive on creating a romance film and desired to add horror film elements. Rumours persist around the production suggesting that Tsui Hark effectively directed the film. British critic Tony Rayns stated that effectively, most Film Workshop productions were "redirected or hijacked by Tsui Hark" Joey Wong was a professional basketball player and model before starting her film career. Prior to working on the film, she appeared in films such as the Taiwanese production It'll Be Very Cold at the Lakeside This Year. She would show up in a few Shaw Brothers produced Hong Kong films and Tsui Hark's film Working Class.

Actors in the film include Leslie Cheung who was also a cantopop singer. Cheung had previously worked with Tsui Hark productions such as A Better Tomorrow and A Better Tomorrow II.  Cheung also sung the films theme song. Wu Ma had previously appeared in several Hong Kong horror film productions such as Spooky Encounters, The Dead and the Deadly and Mr. Vampire. The film used the services of Cinefex Workshop, Hong Kong's first proper special effects studio who had previously worked on Hark's film Zu Warriors from the Magic Mountain. The film script called for a giant slithering tongue and zombies, which were developed by Cinefex technician Man Xian Liang, who taught himself stop motion animation in order to make the effects happen. James Wong contributed to the score of the film. Wong was primarily known for writing songs for pop stars and television programs and completed his first score for Hark's Shanghai Blues.

Release
A Chinese Ghost Story opened on July 18, 1987. The film received theatrical release throughout Asia and Europe. The film also received international recognition when it won the special Jury Prize at the Avoriaz festival in France and the Best Film Award at the Opporto Festival in Portugal in 1987.

Box office
A Chinese Ghost Story performed well at the Hong Kong box office, earning 18,831,638 and becoming 1987's fifteenth highest-grossing film in Hong Kong. In Taiwan, it was the 11th highest-grossing film of 1987, selling 187,654 tickets and earning  (US$443,515). In South Korea, the film sold 31,639 tickets in Seoul upon release in December 1987, equivalent to an estimated .

In the United Kingdom, the film sold 1,045 tickets in 1996, equivalent to an estimated . This adds up to an estimated total of  grossed worldwide (equivalent to an estimated  adjusted for inflation).

2011 re-release and remake

In memory of the late Leslie Cheung, director Ching Siu-tung and producer Ng See-yuen re-released the film in cinemas across mainland China on 30 April 2011. China Radio International reported that the film was remastered with color timing that took about half a year. In addition, premieres took place in both Beijing and Shanghai. Ching Siu-tung, Ng See-yuen and Lau Siu-ming were present. However, Wu Ma and Joey Wong, who were invited, did not attend the premiere. Ching Siu-tung had difficulty tracking down Joey Wong and had to contact her through her family in Taiwan. He received a telephone call at the last minute from Wong's father, stating that the actress was in poor health and not in good condition to attend the premiere. Wong's father also quoted her daughter saying that acting in the film were her best memories. That same year, a remake of the film was released. It starred Louis Koo and Crystal Liu and was directed by Wilson Yip.

Reception and legacy
From contemporary reviews, Walter Goodman (The New York Times) noted poor subtitling on the print he viewed, opining that "If there are any Eastern profundities emanating from the temple, this Westerner did not recognize them." and that "The kick you get from all this will depend on how exciting you find explosive exhibitions of extraterrestrial exercises." Kim Newman (Monthly Film Bulletin) described the film as "an excellent example of the distinctive type of ghost/horror film that has been coming out of Hong Kong for many years" and that the film "affords an insight into a movie mythos at least as highly developed and ritualized as the Universal horror cycle of the 30s or the Hammer films of the 50s and 60s". The film was reviewed by a critic credited as "Mel" in Variety who praised the film, stating that "Cinema City is to be congratulated for searching original Chinese material. The art direction, costumes, cinematography and soundtrack music are all exceptional." The review went on to state that the "storyline portray the beauty and grafility of life on earth" which led to "an entertaining love story with a tantalizing horror background, mixed with fantasy escapism that won't insult adult viewers."

From retrospective reviews, The Guardian described the film as "one of the breakthrough films of modern Hong Kong cinema" and that it was "dubious knockabout comedy [...] spiced with frantic set piece stunts (mid-air fights, thousand-foot tongues); not for those who value comprehensibility over panache." Empire gave the film four stars out of five, noting "gorgeous imagery" and that it was not "quite as completely demented as Mr Vampire, but it is truly strange." Donald C Willis wrote in his book Horror and Science Fiction Film IV that A Chinese Ghost Story was "an entertaining fantasy extravaganza" and that "the movie is very inventive, occasionally even poetic, but not quite moving". John Charles gave the film an eight out of ten rating, noting that some horror elements in the film were in debt to the film The Evil Dead, but noted that the "cinematography and art direction are superb, the action is invigorating, and the love story surprisingly touching, making this one of the most captivating and enjoyable fantasies of the post-New Wave period."

In mainland China, before the film was officially released in 2011, it was already widely circulated through unofficial channels- including smuggled videocassettes, pirated VCDs and DVDs, and later, video-sharing websites- and celebrated as a cult classic. The Chinese generation born in the 1980s, aka. the "post-80s", are among the most devout fans of this film, which they see as an embodiment of idealism, rebellion, nostalgia, and social criticism. Some scholars consider its comic nature, or "half-seriousness," to be the main reason for this cult following.

The modern reception of the film in Hong Kong and Taiwan is positive. At the 24th Hong Kong Film Awards various Asian film critics, film makers and actors voted for the top Chinese films from Hong Kong, Taiwan and China. A Chinese Ghost Story was listed at 50th place on the list. In 2011, the Tapei Golden Horse Film Festival had 122 industry professionals take part in the survey. The voters included film scholars, festival programmers, film directors, actors and producers to vote for the 100 Greatest Chinese-Language Films. A Chinese Ghost Story tied with Jia Zhangke's Xiao Wu (1997) and Zhang Yimou's The Story of Qiu Ju (1992) for 35th place on the list.

Awards and nominations

See also

 Qian Nü You Hun
 List of ghost films

References

Footnotes

Sources

External links

lovehkfilm entry
Film review at The Illuminated Lantern

1987 horror films
1987 films
1980s comedy horror films
1987 fantasy films
1987 romantic comedy films
Hong Kong horror films
Hong Kong fantasy films 
Hong Kong romantic comedy films
1980s romantic fantasy films
1980s Cantonese-language films
  
Films directed by Ching Siu-tung
Hong Kong New Wave films
1980s Hong Kong films